Ioway Creek is a  tributary of the South Skunk River in central Iowa in the United States. It flows into the South Skunk in the southern part the city of Ames near .

Originally named Squaw Creek, it was officially renamed by the U.S. Board on Geographic Names on February 11, 2021.

See also
List of Iowa rivers

References

Rivers of Iowa
Bodies of water of Story County, Iowa